The following is a list of titles featuring the comics character Groo the Wanderer.

List

Short stories

Original graphic novels

Crossover stories

References

Groo the Wanderer